Fuel bunkers, commonly simply known as bunkers, are containers for the storage of fuel on steam-powered boats or steam tank engines, or rooms for the storage of fuel in furnaces.

The term "bunker" or "fuel bunker" is typically only used for storage areas for solid fuels, especially coal; the term "fuel tank" is typically used for liquid fuels (such as gasoline or petrol), or gaseous fuels (such as natural gas).

History

Usage

Steam railway locomotives

Steamships 
For example, on the Titanic the propulsion boilers were heated by burning coal. 6,611 tons of coal were carried in its official bunkers, with a further 1,092 tons carried in Hold 3. The furnaces required over 600 tons of coal a day to be shoveled into them by hand, requiring the services of 176 firemen working around the clock.

Furnaces

References

Fuel containers
Locomotive parts
Steamships
Furnaces
Coal